Marko Ilić may refer to:

Marko Ilić (footballer, born 1985), Serbian football midfielder for FK Srem
Marko Ilić (footballer, born 1998), Serbian football goalkeeper for Vozdovac